Living with the Dead is the ninth novel in Women of the Otherworld series by Kelley Armstrong.

"When Robyn Peltier—a very human PR rep—is framed for murder, the two people most determined to clear her name are half-demon tabloid reporter Hope Adams, and necromancer homicide detective John Findlay. Robyn finds herself in the heart of a world she never knew existed—and which she is safer knowing nothing about..."

References

External links
 Official Kelley Armstrong website

Novels by Kelley Armstrong
2008 Canadian novels